Schnell ermittelt (branded in English as Fast Forward) is an Austrian television series. Its plot centers on Chief Inspector Angelika Schnell who is portrayed by actress Ursula Strauss. Its original German title can be seen as both a play on words - fast investigated - and more commonly as a short description of the series - (Ms.) Schnell investigates. As of 2018 five seasons of the show have been aired.

See also
List of Austrian television series

External links
 

Austrian crime television series
2009 Austrian television series debuts
2000s Austrian television series
2010s Austrian television series
German-language television shows
ORF (broadcaster) original programming